Robert J. Kusse (March 19, 1918 – February 8, 2008) served in the Pennsylvania State Senate from 1977 to 1984.
  He also served in the Pennsylvania House of Representatives.

References

Republican Party Pennsylvania state senators
Republican Party members of the Pennsylvania House of Representatives
1918 births
2008 deaths
20th-century American politicians
People from Warren, Pennsylvania